Chad Alan Gracey (born July 23, 1971, in York, Pennsylvania, US) is the drummer for the bands Live and The Gracious Few. Live have sold over 20 million records, including the 8× platinum album Throwing Copper.

Biography
Gracey is a founding member of the band Live and has appeared on all their albums to date. He met his future Live bandmates in middle school in York. When vocalist Ed Kowalczyk left the band in 2009, Gracey formed the band The Gracious Few along with Patrick Dahlheimer and Chad Taylor of Live and Kevin Martin and Sean Hennesy from the band Candlebox. They released their debut album The Gracious Few in 2010. In 2011, Live announced their intention to record new material. They began recording with new lead singer Chris Shinn in 2012. In 2016, it was announced that Kowalczyk had rejoined the band, with plans to go on tour in 2017.

Equipment
Drums- Pearl drums masters series mrx (silver)
12"x10" Rack Tom
16"x16" Floating Floor Tom
18"x18" Floating Floor Tom
14"x6" snare

Hardware-Pearl
Eliminator single pedal (red cam)
Tama Iron Cobra double-bass pedal (customized)
(7) 1000 series boom stands
throne
eliminator hi hat 3 legs

Cymbals: Zildjian
14" A Custom hats
10" A custom splash
16",17",18",19" A Custom crash
20" A custom Medium ride
14" Oriental China "trash"
14" K custom mini China

Sticks- Pro-Mark
Custom made Pro-Mark Hot Rods, measured between 5A and 5B.

Discography

With Live
 all albums to date

With The Gracious Few
 The Gracious Few (2010)

References

External links 

 Friends of Live (official website)

1971 births
Living people
American rock drummers
Live (band) members
The Gracious Few members
Musicians from Pennsylvania
20th-century American drummers
American male drummers
21st-century American drummers